Sport Club Pick Szeged is a professional Hungarian handball club based in Szeged, Hungary.

Seasons
As of 1 June 2019

References

External links
 Official website 
 MOL-Pick Szeged at eurohandball.com